Ann Darr (March 13, 1920 – December 2, 2007) was an American poet and educator who lived in Washington, D.C.

Biography
Born Lois Ann Russell in Bagley, Iowa she studied at the University of Iowa where she graduated in 1941 and also completed Civilian Pilot Training.

After college she began her career as a writer and broadcaster on the NBC Radio daily program The Women of Tomorrow.

When war broke out and her husband, enlisted in the Navy, she applied to the Women Airforce Service Pilots program and trained at Sweetwater, TX under pioneering aviator Jacqueline Cochran.

She wrote of her experience as a pilot in her 1978 book Cleared For Landing which The Washington Post'''' praised for its "keen perception of the darker side of things."

Darr taught creative writing at American University and at the Writer's Center in Bethesda, Maryland.

She died of Alzheimer's disease and was buried as a veteran in 2007.

Selected worksSt. Ann's Gut (Morrow and Company, 1971)The Myth of a Woman's Fist (Morrow and Company, 1973)Cleared for Landing (Dryad Press, 1978)Riding With the Fireworks (Alice James Books, 1981)Do You Take This Woman (Washington Writers Publishing House, 1986)The Twelve Pound Cigarette (SCOP, 1990)Confessions of a Skewed Romantic (The Bunny and Crocodile Press, 1993)Flying the Zuni Mountains (Forest Woods Media Productions, 1994)Gussie, Mad Hannah & Me (Argonne Press, 1999)Love in the Past Tense'' (Argonne, 2000)

References

External links
Obituary in The Washington Post
  Biography on Dryad Press site
VRZHU Blog remembrance by Grace Cavalieri
Profile at Pritzker Military Museum and Library
Ann Darr reading her poems with comment in the Recording Laboratory, Feb. 7, 1973

American aviation writers
American radio personalities
American University faculty and staff
Aviators from Iowa
Poets from Iowa
1920 births
2007 deaths
University of Iowa alumni
American women poets
20th-century American poets
20th-century American women writers
American women aviators
American women non-fiction writers
20th-century American non-fiction writers
American women academics
21st-century American women